Amianthium is a North American genus of perennial plants growing from bulbs. It contains the single known species Amianthium muscitoxicum, known in English as fly poison from a literal translation of the Latin epithet muscitoxicum, and is noted for its pretty flowers and its toxic alkaloid content. While all parts of the plant are poisonous, the bulb is particularly toxic. The scientific epithet was given to it by Thomas Walter when he published his Flora Caroliniana in 1788.

The bulb was mixed with sugar by American colonists to kill flies.

The toxic alkaloids present in the roots and leaves include jervine and amianthine.  Amianthium is  self-incompatible and is pollinated mostly by beetles.  It is native to eastern North America, as far north as Pennsylvania, west roughly to the Appalachian Mountains (with an additional area in the Ozarks), and south to northern Florida and eastern Louisiana.

Within the family Melanthiaceae, Amianthium is a member of the tribe Melanthieae. Molecular phylogenetic studies in the 21st century have resulted in some changes to placements within this tribe. A. muscitoxicum has sometimes been placed in the genus Zigadenus (as Z. muscitoxicus); however its position as a separate genus is consistent with currently available information. (See also Phylogeny of Melanthieae.)

Amianthium species which have been placed in other genera include:
 Amianthium angustifolium  now called Stenanthium densum 
 Amianthium aspericaule  now called Triantha glutinosa 
 Amianthium leimanthoides  now called Stenanthium densum 
 Amianthium nuttallii  now called Toxicoscordion nuttallii 
 Amianthium texanum  now called Stenanthium densum

References

Nash, L., & Steven, J. C. (2019). Patterns of resource allocation in fly poison (Amianthium muscaetoxicum). Bios, 89(3), 113-117.

Citations 

Melanthiaceae
Flora of the Eastern United States
Melanthiaceae genera
Monotypic Liliales genera
Taxa named by Asa Gray